Ieuan Wyn Pritchard Roberts, Baron Roberts of Conwy, PC (10 July 1930 – 13 December 2013) was a Welsh Conservative politician.

His father was a Minister in a chapel in Llansadwrn, Anglesey, and they lived in the schoolhouse.

He was Member of Parliament (MP) for the constituency of Conwy (formerly Conway) from 1970 until his retirement in 1997. Wyn Roberts served as Parliamentary Private Secretary to the Secretary of State for Wales Peter Thomas from 1970 to 1974, and was Opposition spokesman on Wales between 1974 and 1979. On the 1979 Conservative election victory, he was appointed Parliamentary Under-Secretary of State at the Welsh Office. After the 1987 election, he was promoted to Minister of State at the Welsh Office, a post he held until 1994. He was knighted for political service in 1990.

After his retirement from the House of Commons, he was elevated as a life peer on 1 October 1997 with the title of Baron Roberts of Conwy, of Talyfan in the County of Gwynedd. He served as an opposition spokesman on Wales in the House of Lords until 2007. He died on 13 December 2013, at his home in Rowen, Conwy, Wales.

External links 

 Wyn Roberts Diaries at the National Library of Wales

References

1930 births
2013 deaths
Knights Bachelor
Conservative Party (UK) MPs for Welsh constituencies
Members of the Privy Council of the United Kingdom
UK MPs 1970–1974
UK MPs 1974
UK MPs 1974–1979
UK MPs 1979–1983
UK MPs 1983–1987
UK MPs 1987–1992
UK MPs 1992–1997
Welsh-speaking politicians
Roberts of Conwy, Ieuan Roberts, Baron
Life peers created by Elizabeth II